Ricardo Elvio Pavoni Cúneo (born August 8, 1943 in Montevideo) is a Uruguayan former football defender who played the majority of his career for Club Atlético Independiente in the Argentine First Division.

Career

Club
Pavoni began his football career with the Montevidean club Defensor. Disillusioned with life as a footballer, he was on the point of abandoning the game completely and going to work in a casino as a croupier until he was convinced to play football for Independiente of Argentina. The left-sided full-back has been described as a natural leader and the perfect man-marker. He was also responsible for scoring 57 goals.

He arrived to Independiente at age 21 to replace Tomás Rolan, another Uruguayan who had suffered a serious injury. His first match for Independiente was on March 24, 1965, in a Copa Libertadores match. Independiente beat Boca Juniors by two goals to nil.

For twelve seasons (1965–1976) he was idolised by the Independiente fans. He was particularly remembered for his powering runs along the left wing, putting away free kicks with his left foot and for his frequent last-ditch efforts to clear the ball from the goal-line. He is considered by many to be the archetypal Uruguayan footballer.

Pavoni (affectionately known as "el Chivo") won many honours during his career, including the Argentine first division championships three times, the Copa Libertadores five times, the Copa Interamericana on three occasions and one Copa Intercontinental. He was also a member of the Uruguayan squad that took part in the World Cup of 1974, in West Germany. Since retirement, he has been involved with the club as a trainer with reserve and youth teams. He has also been caretaker manager of the first team on several occasions.

International
Pavoni played 13 times for the Uruguay national team between 1962 and 1974, scoring two goals. He was part of the Uruguay squad for the 1974 FIFA World Cup.

Honours
Independiente
Argentine Primera División (3): Nacional 1967, Metropolitano 1970, Metropolitano 1971
Copa Libertadores (5): 1965, 1972, 1973, 1974, 1975
Copa Interamericana (3): 1973, 1974, 1976
Intercontinental Cup (1): 1973

References

External links
 Futbol Factory profile

1943 births
Living people
Footballers from Montevideo
Uruguayan footballers
Defensor Sporting players
Club Atlético Independiente footballers
Copa Libertadores-winning players
Argentine Primera División players
Uruguayan expatriate footballers
Uruguayan expatriate sportspeople in Argentina
Expatriate footballers in Argentina
Uruguay international footballers
1974 FIFA World Cup players
Association football defenders